Daniel Robert Reeder (born March 18, 1961) is a former American football running back in the National Football League.  "Delaware Dan" Reeder attended the University of Delaware and was drafted in the fifth round of the 1985 NFL Draft by the Los Angeles Raiders.  He was cut by the Raiders and signed with the Pittsburgh Steelers.  He played parts of the 1986 and 1987 seasons with Pittsburgh, appearing in 13 games.  He carried the ball eight times for 28 yards and caught two passes for four yards.  He also returned four kickoffs for 52 yards.

Reeder now lives in Newark, Delaware with his wife and two sons, Troy and Colby.  He coaches Holy Angels football team.  Reeder was the offensive coordinator for the Avon Grove High School Red Devils during their 2009 season, in which they won the Chest-Mont League and climbed to the third round of the state playoffs. After this season, Reeder left his position. The team has since gone on to have back-to-back losing seasons in his absence.

References

1961 births
Living people
American football running backs
Delaware Fightin' Blue Hens football players
National Football League replacement players
Pittsburgh Steelers players
High school football coaches in Pennsylvania
People from Newark, Delaware
People from Shamokin, Pennsylvania
Players of American football from Pennsylvania